The Leyland Panther Cub was a rear-engined single-decker bus manufactured by Leyland from 1964 until 1968.

It was a derivative of the Panther that Leyland were forced into building for an influential customer, it was only offered on the home market, and only bought by operators in England and Wales. Leyland engineers felt it was underpowered and their heart was never in the project, although it was marketed to the extent of full-colour full page press adverts and the production of a demonstrator. Only 94 were built.

Background
The Leyland Panther Cub was a short-wheelbase derivative of the Panther for 10m (33 ft 6in) long  by 2.5m (8 ft 2½ in) wide bodies. It was proposed by Manchester Corporation, whom Leyland had targeted as a potential launch customer for the Panther. Manchester said they were only interested in a rear-engined single-decker 33 ft long and if Leyland didn't build them to that length, it would ask Daimler to build 20 short-wheelbase Roadliners instead.

Due to statutory construction and use rules on maximum rear-overhang length, Leyland considered that the 0.600H engine of the Panther would not be a feasible fit in a shorter version. So instead units from the Leyland Tiger Cub rather than the Leyland Leopard were employed. Manchester already had 15 Tiger Cubs with Park Royal bodies and the first Panther Cub was shown at the 1964 Commercial Motor Show at the Earls Court Exhibition Centre. Sales were patchy thereafter and the model was axed in 1968 by which time Manchester had ordered 30 Panthers.

Description
The steel-channel ladder frame (upswept to the rear) was similar to the Panther but about 2ft shorter, with a wheelbase of 16ft 6in rather than the Panther's standard 18ft 6in or optional  17ft 6in. The front-mounted radiator, front steel-leaf springs, driving controls, fuel-supply, braking system, electrical systems and other ancillaries were standard Panther components, whilst the Leyland 0.400H engine, pneumocyclic gearbox, brakes, axles, eight-stud wheels, tyre equipment and rear steel-leaf springs were units taken from or derived from the Tiger Cub PSUC1/13.

The exhibit at the 1964 show was a Manchester Corporation unit with a Park Royal body derived from the BET design, but featuring deeper windows forward of the exit door. The reviewer for Buses Illustrated noted the unladen weight was 6.5 tons, even though the body was 'well-finished'. The two bodied Panthers on show-stands were for Glasgow and Hull and had, respectively an Alexander body weighing 7ton, 8.75cwt and a Charles H Roe body tipping the scales at 7ton 6cwt. Thus a bodied Panther Cub weighed almost one ton less than the equivalent Panther. Although the chassis type is widely quoted as "PSRC1/1", the designation engraved on the rear chassis cross member of preserved example BND 874C is simply "P/C".

Sales
A total of 94 Panther Cubs were built, 78 for Municipal bus companies. Manchester Corporation bought the 20 it had promised to in 1965, with Portsmouth Corporation Transport the largest purchaser with 26. Panther Cubs also went to BET group fleets East Yorkshire Motor Services (16) and Thomas Brothers of Port Talbot (3).

Problems in operation
These were manifold and difficult for operators to resolve. The Panther Cub was a relatively underpowered chassis asked to do a job beyond its capabilities. Ten of the twenty Manchester examples had turbo-charged engines, the turbocharger fitment designed to give more torque at lower revolutions rather than more horsepower, but the turbocharged engines had more than their share of blown cylinder-head gaskets and was removed to improve reliability, so although the option was offered throughout the Panther Cub's short life, few but the Manchester buses had this version of the 0.400H engine.

East Yorkshire seemed to have least troubles with the type and Manchester found it most troublesome. An engineer with Manchester Corporation during the time they were operated has said that the reluctance of maintenance staff to treat the new buses as different from the older front-engined double-deckers then forming the majority of the Manchester fleet was as much to blame as perceived design weaknesses. This view is supported by their later longevity with smaller operators in the UK and overseas more inclined to adapt and manage difficulties flexibly to overcome them. Yorkshire's East Riding is a generally flat littoral and their Panther Cubs replaced Tiger Cubs that were not very taxed by their duties. The Manchester buses were asked to do the job of 56-seat double-deckers on busy urban routes.

Nobody wanted a Panther Cub coach. The closest alternative in the Leyland Motor Corporation catalogue was the Park Royal-bodied Albion Viking but that only sold six of a planned sixteen. The Panther Cub chassis frame was given AEC units and built in Southall as the short-wheelbase AEC Swift and sold well from 1966 to 1975.

Disposal overseas
Although Panther Cubs had a bad reputation within the United Kingdom they sold well in former British colonies and to UK independents as second-hand bargains. Some saw further service with Australian operators including Calabro Brothers of Bonyrigg, Grenda's Bus Service, Horrell of Wollongong, Johnson's Motor Service of Edgeworth, Keiraville Bus Service, of Fairy Meadow and Tornto Bus Service.

Preservation
Four Panther Cubs have been preserved.

Causes of poor sales
The pace of change was faster in the 1960s than it had been in the previous decade, and the Panther Cub was overtaken by events. The most important of which was a share-exchange in January 1965 between the Department of Transport and Leyland Motor Corporation, this resulted in the Transport Holding Company owning 30% shares in Park Royal Vehicles and Charles H Roe, and Leyland Motor Corporation owning 25% of Bristol Commercial Vehicles and Eastern Coach Works, this removed Bristol chassis and ECW bodies from the sales restrictions that had applied from 1948.

The Bristol RE was available in 10m or 11m form and even in the shorter version, large high-output Leyland and Gardner engines could be fitted. Many customers bought the shorter RESL version and 698 of these were sold between 1966 and 1975. The only 10m long rear-engined single decker chassis to sell better than the RESL in the UK, because of large London Transport orders, was the short-wheelbase AEC Swift, which shared the same frame as the Panther Cub.

References

Jack, The Leyland Bus Mark 2, Glossop 1982
Booth (ed), Classic Bus no 7, Edinburgh, September 1993
Booth (ed), Classic Bus no 26, Edinburgh, November 1996
Booth (ed), Classic Bus no 31, Edinburgh, September 1997
Townsin (ed), Buses Illustrated, Shepperton no116, September 1964
Parke (ed), Buses Illustrated, Shepperton (nos122-4, 9, 131, 154), 1965–68
Curtis, Bristol RE, Shepperton 1987
Lamb (ed) Bus & Coach Preservation, Portsmouth, Volume 5 number 5 October 2002

External links

Flickr gallery

Panther Cub
Vehicles introduced in 1964